Buhutu (Bohutu) is an Oceanic language spoken in Milne Bay Province of Papua New Guinea. Most Buhutu speakers live in the Sagarai River Valley between Mullins Harbour on the south coast and the Pima mountains north of the Sagarai.

Alphabet 
Buhutu language has 19 letters (Aa, Bb, Dd, Ee, Ff, Gg, Hh, Ii, Kk, Ll, Mm, Nn, Oo, Pp, Ss, Tt, Uu, Ww, Yy), glottal stop and seven diphthongs (bw, fw, gw, hw, kw, mw, pw).

References

External links 
 Alphabet and pronunciation

Nuclear Papuan Tip languages
Languages of Milne Bay Province